Margot Douaihy, Ph.D, is an American writer whose works include Scorched Grace (Gillian Flynn Books, 2023), Scranton Lace (Clemson University Press), Girls Like You (Clemson University Press), a Lambda Literary Award Finalist, Bandit / Queen: The Runaway Story of Belle Starr, and the chapbook i would ruby if i could (Factory Hollow Press). She is a Co-Editor of the Cambridge University Press Elements in Crime Narratives Series and the Editor/Advisor of Northern New England Review. Her writing has been featured in PBS NewsHour, The Wisconsin Review, Colorado Review, The South Carolina Review, Diode Editions, Pittsburgh Post Gazette, The Tahoma Literary Review, The Madison Review, The Florida Review, Portland Review, The Tishman Review, The Petigru Review, Petrichor, and The Adirondack Review. 

Western phonetic pronunciation of the surname Douaihy الدويهي is Dew-why-hee.

Books 
Scorched Grace (Gillian Flynn Books, 2023): Sister Holiday, a chain-smoking, heavily tattooed, queer nun, puts her amateur sleuthing skills to the test in this “unique and confident” debut crime novel. When Saint Sebastian's School becomes the target of a shocking arson spree, the Sisters of the Sublime Blood and their surrounding community are thrust into chaos. Unsatisfied with the officials' response, sardonic and headstrong Sister Holiday becomes determined to unveil the mysterious attacker herself and return her home and sanctuary to its former peace. Her investigation leads down a twisty path of suspicion and secrets in the sticky, oppressive New Orleans heat, turning her against colleagues, students, and even fellow Sisters along the way.

Sister Holiday is more faithful than most, but she's no saint. To piece together the clues of this high-stakes mystery, she must first reckon with the sins of her checkered past-and neither task will be easy. An exciting start to Margot Douaihy’s bold series for Gillian Flynn Books that breathes new life into the hard-boiled genre, Scorched Grace is a fast-paced and punchy whodunnit that will keep readers guessing until the very end. "Within five pages, I was in love with this novel." —Gillian Flynn, bestselling author of Gone Girl 

Scorched Grace was named a Most Anticipated debut of 2023 by Goodreads, Crime Reads, LGBTQ Reads, Bookpage, Barnes & Noble, Book Riot, Electric Lit, Novel Suspects, them, Amazon, and The Lineup. Publishing in French with Harper Collins France and in the UK with Pushkin Vertigo. The audiobook of Scorched Grace is narrated by author and actor Mara Wilson.Douaihy's Bandit/Queen: The Runaway Story of Belle Starr (2022) and Scranton Lace (2018) are documentary poetry projects centering themes of queerness, feminist becoming, and class tensions.

Honors 
Douaihy received a 2021 Mass Cultural Council’s Artist Fellowship, a 2019 Sisters in Crime Academic Research Grant, and the 2018 Jesse H Neal / Mattera Award for outstanding mentorship in the publishing industry. She was a finalist for the 2020-2021 Humboldt Poetry Prize (The Florida Review), 2020 Aesthetica Magazine Creative Writing Prize, 2020 Palette Poetry Sappho Prize, the 2019 Red Hen Press Quill Prose Award in Fiction, and a 2016 Lambda Literary Award. 

The book discovery site Shepard.com added Scranton Lace to the list of "Best Books With Poetry Inspired By History."

Scorched Grace received a starred review by Publishers Weekly: "Stunning fiction debut ... briskly plotted master class in character development." Scorched Grace is also a New York Times Book Review Editors’ Choice, American Booksellers’ Indie Next Pick & IndieBound Favorite of March 2023, Amazon Editors’ Choice, Apple Books and Powell’s Books Pick of the Month, one of CrimeReads’ Best Debuts of the Month, BookPage's Top Ten Books of March 2023, a Book Marks Best Reviewed Novel of the Week, and an Indie Bestseller (St. Louis, Boswell).

Personal life 
Margot Douaihy was born and raised in Scranton, Pennsylvania, and is of Lebanese ancestry. She received a PhD in Creative Writing from the University of Lancaster. A queer woman, Margot is a longtime advocate for LGBTQ+ inclusion and visibility, as well as antiracist education.

References

Year of birth missing (living people)
Living people
Writers from Scranton, Pennsylvania
21st-century American women writers
21st-century American writers

Queer writers